The Mercer Brown House is a historic house located at Rising Sun, Cecil County, Maryland, United States. It consists of three distinct portions: a two-story, three-bay, gable-roofed Flemish bond brick part dating to 1746; a three bay wide frame portion of the house dating to the early and late 19th century; and a log pen addition. The house is an example of the Pennsylvania Quaker building tradition in Maryland. The property also has an early-20th century bank barn.

The Mercer Brown House was listed on the National Register of Historic Places on May 29, 1987.

References

External links
, including undated photo, at Maryland Historical Trust

Houses in Cecil County, Maryland
Houses on the National Register of Historic Places in Maryland
Houses completed in 1746
Quakerism in Maryland
National Register of Historic Places in Cecil County, Maryland